"The Rhythm of the Night" is a song by Italian Eurodance group Corona. It was released as their debut single in 1993 in Italy, then elsewhere the following year. The song is the title track of the group's debut studio album, The Rhythm of the Night (1995), and was written by Francesco Bontempi, Annerley Emma Gordon, Giorgio Spagna, Pete Glenister and Mike Gaffey. It was produced by Bontempi, and the vocals were performed by Italian singer Giovanna Bersola, who is not credited on the single and does not appear in the music video. The woman who appears in the video is the group's frontwoman Olga Souza. The video was A-listed on Music TV-channels, such as Germany's VIVA. The song was a worldwide hit in 1994, peaking at number-one in Italy, and within the top five in most of Europe, while in the US, it fell short of the top ten, reaching number eleven on both the Billboard Hot 100 and the Cash Box Top 100.

Background and release

The song was credited to Francesco Bontempi, Annerley Emma Gordon, Giorgio Spagna, Pete Glenister and Mike Gaffey.
In 1987 the Pete Glenister and Mike Gaffey written song "Save Me" performed by German pop duo Say When! was released. The Rhythm of the Night borrows heavily from this track, namely the music and specifically the lyrics "Round and round we go, each time I hear you say", along with other similar lyrics shared by the two songs. As a result, the two received writing credits on The Rhythm of the Night.

At the time she got the gig, Italian singer Giovanna Bersola suffered from stage fright, and would only be doing studio work. Brazilian singer Olga Souza would be fronting the song on stage and tour instead of Bersola, as well as in its accompanying music video. Bersola told in a 2021 interview, “The studio was safe for me, it was no windows, just me and the music. It was a time when dance and Euro was very prolific in Europe and I was living in Italy at the time, so I was singing three or four songs a day as a session voice.” According to Souza fronting the group instead of her and that they didn’t use Bersola's image on the single cover, she felt that it suited her, “That gave me the freedom to be absolutely no one.” Bersola is no longer suffering from stage fright and now lives in New Zealand. "The Rhythm of the Night" was released in 1993 in Italy, and the following year, it was released internationally.

Chart performance
"The Rhythm of the Night" achieved huge success worldwide. It reached number one in Italy and stayed there for eight consecutive weeks. In Europe the single entered the Eurochart Hot 100 on 12 February at number 63, and made a slow climb up to peak at five on 17 September. In the end of 1994, it was the longest-charting single on the Eurochart Hot 100. It peaked within the top ten in several countries, including Australia (8), Austria (6), Denmark (4), France (3), Germany (8), Iceland (4), Ireland (3), the Netherlands (5), New Zealand (7), Scotland (2), Spain (3), Switzerland (3) and the United Kingdom (2). Additionally, it was a top 20 hit in Belgium (13) and a 30 hit in Sweden (28). In the United States, "The Rhythm of the Night" reached number eleven on both the Billboard Hot 100 and the Cash Box Top 100.

"The Rhythm of the Night" entered the European Border Breakers airplay chart at 21 on 9 April due to crossover airplay in West, Central, North and South-West Europe (also after topping the Italian charts for 8 weeks). It peaked at number four on 5 November. In the US, the song was a top ten hit on radio as well, peaking at number nine in the Billboard Mainstream Top 40 chart and at number seven in the Billboard Rhythmic Top 40 chart.

The song was an even bigger hit on the dance charts. It peaked at number one on the French dance chart, number two on the Canadian RPM Dance/Urban chart, number three on the UK Dance Chart, and number seven on the Billboard Hot Dance Club Play chart in the United States.

Critical reception
Scottish Aberdeen Evening Express complimented "The Rhythm of the Night" as "a great Euro pop record" that "has been a top 10 hit in every European country." Larry Flick from Billboard wrote, "Recent No. 1 U.K./European hit is finally issued domestically, and it already appears to be on the road to meeting with similar success here." He explained, "Thumping Italo disco beats support glossy faux-rave synths and a diva vocal that is forceful without being overly aggressive. A wildly catchy and repetitive chorus already has begun to woo radio programmers in several major markets on import." Dave Sholin from the Gavin Report reported, "Key programmers are catching on to this one and fast – for one very good reason: It's hot! Coming off a number one run in the U.K., Corona is set up to blowout Stateside." 

In his UK chart commentary, James Masterton felt it's "more conventional dance though just has the edge for the moment". Pan-European magazine Music & Media said, "Nocturnal dance party animals and daytime radio programmers sweat to the pulsating Euro beat. When the mistress of seduction hits the mike, only a glass of Corona can cool you down." Alan Jones from Music Week viewed it as a "extremely commercial pop hit from the Continent." He also found that the more concise Rapino edit is also assailing ears on radio, and its concise form will win it many admirers." John Kilgo from The Network Forty described it as a "uptempo high-energy dance number" that is "set to explode." James Hamilton from the RM Dance Update called it a "Olga De Souza cooed Euro smash". Jonathan Bernstein from Spin complimented it as "magnificent". Paul Sexton from The Times declared it as an "hedonistic anthem".

Samples
In 2019, the chorus of the song was sampled in the Black Eyed Peas and J Balvin's "Ritmo (Bad Boys for Life)", which appeared on the soundtrack of the 2020 film Bad Boys for Life.

Impact and legacy

"The Rhythm of the Night" was awarded one of BMI's Pop Awards in 1996, honoring the songwriters, composers and music publishers of the song.

In 2013, Vibe ranked it number nine in their list of "Before EDM: 30 Dance Tracks from the '90s That Changed the Game".  In 2014, Idolator ranked it number 25 on their list of "The 50 Best Pop Singles of 1994". Bradley Stern described it as a "spacey synth-pop jam" and "true staple of early '90s club anthems". He concluded, "As soon as that almighty call to arms rings out ("This is the rhythm of the night!"), 20 years later, there's still no choice but to become a slave to the rhythm all over again."

In 2017, BuzzFeed ranked it number two in "The 101 Greatest Dance Songs of the '90s" list. Stopera and Galindo wrote, "'The Rhythm of the Night' is not only a song, it's a lifestyle. It's a triumph. A feeling. Pure joy. This song will take you places!!"

During the COVID-19 pandemic, the song regained prominence due to the band's name, which shares its name with the group of viruses that cause COVID-19. According to Italian author William Silvestri, the band and its most famous hit were remembered to "exorcise the fear of COVID-19". He argues that "COVID-19 was needed to remind us that, after all, the first case of "Corona" to go viral in the world was precisely this dance group." Olga Souza, known in her native Brazil as Corona, commented about the Internet memes associating her band with COVID-19 in an interview with Extra: "I have seen a lot of memes. We are all alarmed right now. This kind of news surely brings us a lot of anxiety, because we don't know how to deal with [the virus] yet. It would be a lot better if the world was infected by the song instead of that dangerous virus."

In 2022, "The Rhythm of the Night" was ranked number 68 in Rolling Stones list of "200 Greatest Dance Songs of All Time". Same year, The Guardian ranked it number 50 in their "The 70 Greatest No 2 Singles – Ranked!". Alexis Petridis wrote, "Nineties Euro pop-house was seldom a finely wrought artistic enterprise, but just occasionally, it hit on something incredible. The work of shadowy Italian producers and British songwriters for hire, promoted by a “singer” who didn’t appear on the song itself, "The Rhythm of the Night" perfectly captures the anticipatory excitement of night out about to happen."

Accolades

Track listings

Original version
CD single
"The Rhythm of the Night" (radio edit) (4:24)
"The Rhythm of the Night" (club mix) (5:31)

7" single
"The Rhythm of the Night" (Rapino Brothers radio version)
"The Rhythm of the Night" (Original Italian club mix)

12" maxi – Italy, Spain, Germany
"The Rhythm of the Night" (club mix) (5:31)
"The Rhythm of the Night" (radio edit) (4:20)
"The Rhythm of the Night" (RBX E.U.R.O. mix) (5:05)
"The Rhythm of the Night" (extended 2# groove mix) (5:30)
"The Rhythm of the Night" (a capella) (5:25)

12" maxi – UK
"The Rhythm of the Night" (Luvdup Burning Bush vocal mix) (7:59)
"The Rhythm of the Night" (Luvdup Tequila on a Spoon mix) (5:57)
"The Rhythm of the Night" (Rapino Brothers Let's Get Fizzical piano mix) (5:06)
"The Rhythm of the Night" (Lee Marrow remix) (6:24)

Remixes version

Charts

Weekly charts

Year-end charts

Certifications and sales

Release history

Cascada version

On 2 June 2012, dance group Cascada performed "The Rhythm of the Night" in a bar opening, leading to speculation that the song would be the group's new single. The single was released on 22 June. It was a top ten hit in Austria, but only reached the top 30 in the group's native Germany. It was included on their compilation album, The Best of Cascada (2013).

Track list
Digital download
"The Rhythm of the Night" (radio edit) – 3:22
"The Rhythm of the Night" (Crew Cardinal radio edit) – 3:35
"The Rhythm of the Night" (Ryan T. & Rick M. radio edit) – 3:58
"The Rhythm of the Night" (extended mix) – 4:44
"The Rhythm of the Night" (Crew Cardinal remix) – 5:50
"The Rhythm of the Night" (Ryan T. & Rick M. remix) – 5:43

Music video
The music video for the song was directed by Iulian Moga, the Romanian film director noted for making music videos. It was released on 22 June, first to those who had 'liked' Cascada's official page on Facebook, then on general release. The video shows Dutch rapper Nicci, singing his part of the song, and Horler in a yellow jacket, rocking a rich old woman's mansion. The party in the house also comes with police officers, that turn out to be strippers.

Charts

Other cover versions
In 2008, the song was covered by Dutch pop group Hermes House Band, and reached number 16 in France and number 55 in Germany.

In 2013, British band Bastille recorded "Of the Night", a medley of "The Rhythm of the Night" and "Rhythm Is a Dancer" by Snap!.

Hattie Webb of the Webb Sisters covered the song; her version was used in the McDonald's advert campaign "We Are Awake" and her EP Mouth of the Sea, released on 11 November 2016.

Jenny B, who sang on the original track, sang the cover used on the 2018 video game Just Dance 2019.

See also
List of number-one hits of 1994 (Italy)
"Of the Night"
"Ain't Nobody"

References

External links
Corona - The Rhythm of the Night (Official Music Video), 1995. Rhino.

1993 songs
1993 debut singles
1994 singles
2012 singles
Cascada songs
Corona (band) songs
English-language Italian songs
Hermes House Band songs
Number-one singles in Italy
Songs written by Ann Lee (singer)
Songs written by Giorgio Spagna
Music videos directed by Giacomo De Simone
Warner Music Group singles
ZYX Music singles